Eucalyptus tenuipes, known as the narrow-leaved white mahogany, is a species of small tree that is endemic to Queensland. It has rough, fibrous bark, narrow lance-shaped leaves arranged in opposite pairs, flower buds in group of eleven to twenty, white flowers and spherical to hemispherical fruit.

Description
It has rough, greyish brown, fibrous bark on the trunk and branches. Flowering has been observed in January, March, May and July and the flowers are white.

Taxonomy and naming
In 1928, Joseph Maiden and William Blakely described Eucalyptus acmenoides var. tenuipes in Maiden's book, A Critical Revision of the Genus Eucalyptus from specimens collected by Harald Ingemann Jensen near "Meteor Creek, South Central Queensland".<ref name=APNI1>{{cite web|title=Eucalyptus acmenoides var. tenuipes|url= https://id.biodiversity.org.au/instance/apni/455180|publisher=APNI|access-date=6 January 2020}}</ref> In 1931, Blakely and Cyril Tenison White raised the variety to species status as E. tenuipes in Proceedings of the Royal Society of Queensland. The specific epithet (tenuipes) is from the Latin tenui- meaning "slender" or "thin" and pes meaning "foot", referring to the thin pedicels of the flower buds.

Distribution and habitatEucalyptus tenuipes grows in open forest on gently slopes between Rockhampton and St George and sporadically further north.

Conservation status
This eucalypt is classified as "least concern" under the Queensland Government Nature Conservation Act 1992''.

See also
List of Eucalyptus species

References

tenuipes
Myrtales of Australia
Trees of Australia
Plants described in 1928